Whitegate GAA is a Gaelic Athletic Association club located in the village of Whitegate, County Clare, Ireland.  The club is a senior hurling club and competes in Clare GAA competitions.

Major honours
 Clare Senior Hurling Championship (2): 1950, 1961
 Clare Intermediate Hurling Championship (7): 1939 (as Mountshannon), 1942 (as Mountshannon), 1959, 1984, 1992, 2009, 2013
 Clare Junior A Hurling Championship (1): 1938 (as Mountshannon)
 Clare Under-21 A Hurling Championship (1): 1972

Notable players
 Brendan Bugler

References

External links
Clare GAA site
Official Whitegate GAA website

Gaelic games clubs in County Clare
Hurling clubs in County Clare